The Rapirrán River is a river of South America. Beginning in western Brazil just east of the Peruvian border, the river forms the international border with Peru as it flows eastward. It then forms Bolivia's northernmost border with Brazil.

The town of Rapirrán lies on the river.

See also
List of rivers of Bolivia

References
Rand McNally, The New International Atlas, 1993.

Rivers of Acre (state)
Rivers of Peru
Bolivia–Brazil border
Brazil–Peru border
International rivers of South America
Rivers of Pando Department